Aishath Azeema is a Maldivian diplomat currently serving as the Maldives' ambassador to China.

After completing the GCE Ordinary Level, Azeema subsequently joined the Ministry of Foreign Affairs as a public servant in 1988. She worked in various departments, primarily the Department of External Resources and the Foreign Relations Department, at one point serving as English secretary at the ministry. For five years, she served as a minister-counsellor and head of chancery at the Maldivian Embassy in India, a close partner nation to the Maldives.

Having returned to serve as joint secretary in charge of the China and Japan Divisions in 2014, Azeema helped negotiate the Maldives' first bilateral free trade agreement, with China, which beginning with the presidency of Abdulla Yameen has become a major influence in the country. Then, after a stint as chargé d'affaires or deputy secretary at the Maldivian Embassy in the United Kingdom, she was appointed ambassador to China in 2019. During her tenure, Azeema has worked to build "enduring friendly ties" with Beijing. In the early stages of the COVID-19 pandemic, she oversaw government support to Maldivians in China.

References 

Living people
Year of birth missing (living people)
Maldivian women diplomats
Women ambassadors
Ambassadors of the Maldives to China